Anna of the North is the solo project of Anna Lotterud, an Oslo-based Norwegian singer-songwriter from Gjøvik. Originally formed as a duo with producer Brady Daniell-Smith in 2014, their debut studio album Lovers was released in 2017. Daniell-Smith left the group in 2018, with Lotterud continuing to use the name. The second album, Dream Girl, released in October 2019, was made by Lotterud in association with various producers. The music has been regarded as "soft, soul-baring electro-pop".

Early life 
Anna Lotterud was born in 1989 in the small town of Gjøvik in Norway. Her father was a musician. She studied graphic design before moving to Melbourne for further studies.

Music career 
During her studies in Melbourne, Australia, Anna met New Zealand producer Brady Daniell-Smith at one of his shows and together formed Anna Of The North, with Anna performing vocals and Brady producing the melodies.

In June 2014, Anna of the North released their debut single "Sway", which became an immediate internet hit and landed the duo a record deal with Honeymoon in the US. In September 2014, The Chainsmokers officially remixed "Sway".

They followed up the song with "The Dreamer" and "Baby", hitting the top in Hype Machine and later supporting Kygo on tour across Europe. Over the next few months, she released the song "Us" and "Oslo" to critical acclaim.

In May 2017, Anna of the North announced their debut album Lovers with the title track and third single "Someone" for release on 8 September. 
This album included the song "Lovers"; Anna has said this song was inspired by a relationship ending; "I was really in love with this guy, and he broke up with me and it was super sad", although "There’s still a hopefulness in there... There’s still a future ahead, life is gonna get better."

In July 2017, Anna was featured on Tyler, the Creator's singles "Boredom" and "911 / Mr. Lonely" off his album Flower Boy alongside Rex Orange County and Frank Ocean, respectively. Anna was also invited to perform with Tyler, the Creator and Steve Lacy on The Late Show with Stephen Colbert.

Brady Daniell-Smith left the duo amicably in 2018.

Anna's second studio album, Dream Girl, was released on 25 October 2019. The title track appeared in an iPad Pro commercial in 2020. In October 2020, she released the EP Believe.

In 2021 she released the single "Here's To Another".

Use in films
The song Lovers, from the album of the same name, was the soundtrack for a romantic scene in the 2018 Netflix movie To All the Boys I’ve Loved Before. The song Dream Girl, from the album of the same name, was featured on the soundtrack for the 2021 Netflix movie To All The Boys: Always and Forever.
Together with Ian Hultquist and Drum & Lace, Anna of the North contributed the songs 'Dancing on My Own' and 'Escape' to the original soundtrack for the 2022 romantic comedy Rosaline.

Discography

Studio albums

EPs

Singles

Guest appearances

Awards and nominations

Sweden GAFFA Awards
Delivered since 2010, the GAFFA Awards (Swedish: GAFFA Priset) are a Swedish award that rewards popular music awarded by the magazine of the same name.

!
|-
| 2018
| Herself
| Best Foreign New Act
| 
| style="text-align:center;" |
|-
|}

References

External links
Official website 

Musicians from Gjøvik
Norwegian singer-songwriters
Norwegian expatriates in Australia
1991 births
21st-century Norwegian singers
Living people
21st-century Norwegian women singers